Ajay Kumar Chaursiya is a Nepalese politician. He served as the Asst. Minister in the Ministry of Federal Affairs and Local Development from 2001-2002.

He is (as of August 2022) a central committee member of Nepali Congress Party and chief of Terai-Madhesh Coordination Department.

Early life 
He was born and raised in Amarpatti, Parsa, and completed his primary and secondary and higher education in Motihari, Bihar.

Career 
He is a politician in the Terai region. He is  representative to the Pratinidhi Sabha in the Nepalese legislature on behalf of the Nepali Congress.

He was a Member of Parliament from Nepali Congress in 1999, 2006, and 2007. He represents the Parsa District, Constituency 2, Birgunj Nepal.

In 2001, he was appointed as an Asst. Minister of Federal Affairs and Local Development of Nepal in the cabinet of Sher Bahadur Deuba. He took part in the People's Movement (Janandolan 2) and was arrested several times, imprisoned for more than 4 months. Chaurasia was elected twice as member to the constituent Assembly from Parsa 3 and Parsa 2 of Parsa District.

References

Living people
Nepali Congress politicians from Madhesh Province
Nepal MPs 1999–2002
Nepal MPs 2022–present
1965 births
Members of the 1st Nepalese Constituent Assembly